Curl Manitoba (formerly the Manitoba Curling Association) is the organization responsible for curling in the province of Manitoba. Its stated mission is "to promote, develop and grow the sport of curling in Manitoba, Canada and the world by providing leadership, services and programs for the curling community from grassroots to elite.".

The Manitoba Curling Association was created in 2000 when the men's only Manitoba Curling Association (MCA) amalgamated with the women's only Manitoba Ladies Curling Association (MLCA). In September 2009 the association adopted the new name Curl Manitoba along with a new logo.

Provincial championships
Viterra Championship (Men's)
Manitoba Scotties Tournament of Hearts (women's)
Junior Men's (Under 20)
Junior Women's
Senior Men's (50+)
Senior Women's 
Masters Men's (60+)
Masters Women's
Mixed
The Dominion Curling Club Championships (men's & women's)
8-Ender Youth Jamboree (Under 16; 4 divisions: boy's and girl's recreational and boy's and girl's championship)

See also 
List of curling clubs in Manitoba

External links 
Official Site
 Manitoba odds

References 

Man
Sports governing bodies of Manitoba
Curling in Manitoba